Don Francisco may refer to:

 Don Francisco (musician)
 Don Francisco (television host)
 Don Francisco de Paula Marín
 Don Francisco, a co-founder of the National Off-Road Racing Association